Bhatt Majra is a village in Sirhind mandal, district Fatehgarh Sahib, state Punjab, India.
The village is on the world map for organic farming, visited by Prince Charles in 2005.

It is 41 km from its state's main city, Chandigarh.

References

Villages in Fatehgarh Sahib district